Terry Alan Crews (born July 30, 1968) is an American actor, television host, artist, and former American football player. He played Julius Rock in the UPN/CW sitcom Everybody Hates Chris, which aired from 2005 to 2009, and portrayed Terry Jeffords in the Fox and NBC sitcom Brooklyn Nine-Nine (2013–2021). Crews starred in the BET reality series The Family Crews (2010–2011), and hosted the U.S. version of the game show Who Wants to Be a Millionaire from 2014 to 2015. He has appeared in films, including Friday After Next (2002), White Chicks (2004), Idiocracy (2006), Blended (2014), the Expendables series (2010–2014), and Rumble (2021). Crews began hosting America's Got Talent in 2019, following his involvement in the same role for the program's spin-off series America's Got Talent: The Champions.

Crews played as a defensive end and linebacker in the National Football League (NFL) for the Los Angeles Rams, San Diego Chargers, and Washington Redskins, as well as in the World League of American Football (WLAF) for the Rhein Fire and college football at Western Michigan University.

A public advocate for women's rights and activist against sexism, Crews has shared stories of the abuse his family endured at the hands of his violent father, and was also included among the group of people named as Time Person of the Year in 2017 for going public with stories of sexual assault during the Me Too movement.

Early life and education
Crews was born on July 30, 1968, in Flint, Michigan, the son of Patricia Ann (Simpson) and Terry Crews. The middle child of three, he grew up in a strict Christian household in Flint and was raised mainly by his mother, who was eighteen when he was born. His father was an alcoholic and abusive to his mother. Crews received a flute from his great aunt, and took lessons for eight years. He spent a summer at Interlochen Arts Academy and entered Western Michigan University in Kalamazoo on an art scholarship. After his freshman year, he tried out for the football team and earned a full athletic scholarship.

Football career

Crews was drafted by the Los Angeles Rams in the 11th round of the 1991 NFL Draft. His career included stints with the Rams (six games), the Green Bay Packers (no games), the San Diego Chargers (10 games), the Washington Redskins (16 games), and the Philadelphia Eagles (no games). He also played for the Rhein Fire of the World League of American Football (later NFL Europe) during its 1995 season. Repeatedly cut from rosters, Crews often supplemented his football income by receiving portrait commissions from teammates.

Acting career

After retiring from the NFL in 1997, Crews moved to Los Angeles to pursue an acting career. He had a long-standing ambition to work in the film industry, but up until then had no plans to pursue acting, and simply wanting to be involved in some way. A year earlier, he co-wrote and co-produced the independent feature film Young Boys Incorporated. A self-funded production filmed in Detroit with an anti-drug message, the film drew on his own observations, as well as those of his friends and family. Despite describing it as a "horrible" film, he credits the experience with getting him interested in the film industry.

In 1999, Crews auditioned for a role as a character athlete (known as Warriors) in the syndicated game show Battle Dome, which became his first acting part. He played T-Money for two seasons until its cancellation in 2001. The audition process and the opportunity to perform in front of an audience made him realize that he wanted to pursue acting as a career. However, he failed to land another acting job for the following two years.

Appearances in commercials for products such as Old Spice, films, and music videos soon followed. His breakout role came in Friday After Next starring rapper-turned-actor Ice Cube, for whom Crews previously worked as on-set security. Having never taken acting classes, instead he asked himself what the audience wanted, and he believes this ultimately brought him success. He now believes acting is what he was born to do and would not wish to have any other career, despite the physically demanding nature of the work.

Based on his performance in White Chicks (2004), Adam Sandler changed a role in The Longest Yard (2005) to give it to Crews, who auditioned for another role in the film. His role as Julius Rock, the father on the UPN/CW sitcom on Everybody Hates Chris, brought Crews wider public recognition, and the series aired for four seasons from 2005 to 2009. Since then, Crews has had main roles as husband and father Nick Kingston-Persons in the TBS sitcom Are We There Yet?, which aired for three seasons from 2010, and as NYPD Sergeant (and commencing in Season 7, Lieutenant) Terry Jeffords in the Fox/NBC ensemble sitcom Brooklyn Nine-Nine, which premiered in 2013.

Crews has appeared mainly in comedic roles, such as President Camacho in Idiocracy, but he later found success in action roles beginning with his part as Hale Caesar in The Expendables series, which saw him make his first appearance in a film sequel. Although he has managed to sustain an athletic physique in his career as an actor, Crews has avoided being type-cast as a muscle-bound action hero and has attained critical success through exploiting the contrast of his elaborate character comedy with his physique, which extends to the point of even mocking the stereotype of the gym-obsessed bodybuilder. This contrast has also led to sustained work as part of various humorous Old Spice TV commercials.

He has lent his voice to animations such as American Dad! and Cloudy with a Chance of Meatballs 2. He found that he enjoyed the work and sought out more of it, finding satisfaction in how it carries his spirit into the animation. From 2010 to 2011, Crews starred in his own reality series on BET, The Family Crews. It ran for two seasons. From 2014 to 2015, he hosted the syndicated game show Who Wants to Be a Millionaire. He has also been the American host of Netflix's Ultimate Beastmaster.

For eight seasons he played Terry Jeffords on Brooklyn Nine-Nine. In June 2020, Crews stated in an interview with Access Daily that four planned episodes for Season 8 had been aborted following the George Floyd protests, as the murder of George Floyd prompted the producers to reassess the direction of the season's storyline. The series was not renewed for a ninth season. In early 2021, Crews commented: "I'm sad it will end, but happy to have had the chance to be a part of something so special".  

Crews cites the many similarities between acting and professional football, including the structure and expectations, as helping his transition between the two careers. He credits Reginald Hubbard with mentoring him in his early career in the film business.

In June 2017, he was cast in the science fiction comedy film Sorry to Bother You. The film was released in theaters on July 6, 2018. Also in 2018, he appeared as Bedlam in the superhero film Deadpool 2. Crews made appearances in the music videos for "Pressure" and "Algorithm" by British rock band Muse.

Crews also starred in the video for Brittany Howard's 2019 song "Stay High" in which he lip-syncs the vocals.

Other ventures

Illustration and portraiture
Crews's first job in the arts was as a courtroom sketch artist in Flint, Michigan. He received an art scholarship from college before an athletic scholarship. He later worked as courtroom sketch artist for WJRT. During his football career, Crews supplemented his income by creating portraits of fellow players. At times it was the primary income on which his family depended, typically bringing $5,000 for a two-month commission. His work included a series of NFL-licensed lithographs. He believes his imaginative side has transferred itself to his acting work.

Design
Crews and fashion designer Nana Boateng founded a design company called Amen & Amen. Their first collection was a set of furniture and light fixtures by the designer and artist Ini Archibong. In 2017 Crews designed a collection of furniture for Bernhardt Design which was shown at the International Contemporary Furniture Fair (ICFF) in New York.

Film production 
In 2021, announced that Amen & Amen had entered the film production sector as a "virtual production studio" based in Pasadena, California.

Writing 
In 2021 Crews and his wife Rebecca King wrote a memoir titled Together: How Fame, Failure and Faith Transformed Our Lives. He has written several other books including Tough: My Journey to True Power. He has also written and illustrated children's books including Terry's Crew, and with Ken Harvey, Come Find Me, a story about the adventures of two brothers, Anthony and Marcus, who are based on Crews' sons.

Personal life

Crews is a devout Christian. He met Rebecca King when he was a college sophomore; she was the music minister at a local church. They married on July 29, 1989. They have four daughters and a son, Isaiah Crews, also an actor, and one grandchild. 

In 2014, Crews released his autobiography, Manhood: How to Be a Better Man or Just Live with One. In the book, Crews detailed his long-standing pornography addiction, which had seriously affected his marriage and his life, but which he overcame around 2009 and 2010 after entering rehabilitation. Since then he has taken an active role in speaking out about the condition and its impact, including posting on Facebook in his Dirty Little Secret Series.

Crews is very keen on personal development and his favorite book is The Master Key System by Charles F. Haanel: "I have read hundreds of personal development books, but this is the one that clearly showed me how to visualize, contemplate, and focus on what I truly wanted. It revealed to me that we only get what we desire most, and to apply myself with a laserlike focus upon a goal, task or project. That in order to 'have', you must 'do', and in order to 'do', you must 'be' - and this process is immediate. [...] I also reread it probably once a month to keep my vision clear". 

On March 10, 2021, Crews announced the Ethereum-based cryptocurrency $POWER.

Sexual assault of Crews
On October 10, 2017, in the wake of numerous Hollywood actresses going public with their stories of sexual harassment and assault by film producer Harvey Weinstein, Crews revealed that a male Hollywood executive groped him at a party in 2016, but he did not report the incident for fear of retaliation. It was later revealed that the "high-level executive" was Adam Venit, head of the motion picture department of the talent company William Morris Endeavor (WME).

For his part in coming forward with the sexual assault allegations, Crews was named as one of the "Silence Breakers" from the Time Person of the Year award in 2017. WME reportedly concluded from an investigation that the incident was isolated. Venit was demoted and returned to work after a one-month suspension. In response, Crews stated, "Someone got a pass". Crews filed a lawsuit against Venit and WME for sexual assault. Some witnesses stated that Venit had gotten intoxicated, dismissed the groping as "horseplay", and apologized to Crews the next day. WME responded to the lawsuit, arguing that their reaction to Crews' claims was "both swift and serious". In March 2018, prosecutors decided not to file any charges against Venit. The city attorney's office announced that the statute of limitations to prosecute Venit had expired, as the alleged incident was in February 2016 and Crews did not report it until November 2017.

After claiming that producer Avi Lerner attempted to silence him on the assault in order to retain his role in The Expendables film series, Crews vowed not to appear in any further installments of the franchise.

Filmography

References

External links

 BET Shows – The Family Crews website
 
 
 Just Sports Stats

1968 births
20th-century American male actors
21st-century American comedians
21st-century American male actors
21st-century American male artists
Actors from Flint, Michigan
African-American Christians
African-American artists
African-American bodybuilders
African-American game show hosts
African-American male actors
African-American players of American football
American Christians
American bodybuilders
American football defensive ends
American football linebackers
American game show hosts
American male comedians
American male film actors
American male television actors
American male voice actors
Artists from Michigan
Comedians from Michigan
Courtroom sketch artists
Living people
Los Angeles Rams players
Male actors from Michigan
Participants in American reality television series
Philadelphia Eagles players
Players of American football from Flint, Michigan
Rhein Fire players
San Diego Chargers players
Washington Redskins players
Western Michigan Broncos football players
Who Wants to Be a Millionaire?